Ralf Gustav Dahrendorf, Baron Dahrendorf,  (1 May 1929 – 17 June 2009) was a German-British sociologist, philosopher, political scientist and liberal politician. A class conflict theorist, Dahrendorf was a leading expert on explaining and analysing class divisions in modern society. Dahrendorf wrote multiple articles and books, his most notable being Class Conflict in Industrial Society (1959) and Essays in the Theory of Society (1968).

During his political career, he was a Member of the German Parliament, Parliamentary Secretary of State at the Foreign Office of Germany, European Commissioner for Trade, European Commissioner for Research, Science and Education and Member of the British House of Lords, after he was created a life peer in 1993. He was subsequently known in the United Kingdom as Lord Dahrendorf.

He served as director of the London School of Economics and Warden of St Antony's College, University of Oxford. He also served as a Professor of Sociology at a number of universities in Germany and the United Kingdom, and was a Research Professor at the Berlin Social Science Research Center.

Biography

Family
Dahrendorf was born in Hamburg, Germany, in 1929, the son of Lina and Gustav Dahrendorf and brother of Frank Dahrendorf.

Dahrendorf was known for strongly supporting anti-Nazi activities. As a child, Ralf was a member of the Deutsches Jungvolk, the youngest branch of the Hitler Youth. When Ralf was only a teenager, he and his father, an SPD member of the German Parliament, were arrested and sent to concentration camps for their anti-Nazi activities during the Nazi regime. One of the activities consisted of Dahrendorf distributing leaflets that were encouraging people not to join the regime. After this, his family moved to Berlin. In 1944, during the last year of the Second World War, he was arrested again for engaging in anti-Nazi activities and sent to a concentration camp in Poland. He was released in 1945.

Marriages and children
Dahrendorf was married three times. He married his first wife, Vera, in 1954. She was a fellow student at the London School of Economics. Together they had three daughters: Nicola, Alexandra and Daphne Dahrendorf. Nicola Dahrendorf has worked for the United Nations and as the West Africa Regional Conflict Adviser to the UK Government.

From 1980 to 2004, he was married to historian and translator Ellen Dahrendorf (née Ellen Joan Krug), the daughter of Professor James Krug. When he was created a peer in 1993, his wife became known as Lady Dahrendorf. Ellen Dahrendorf, who is Jewish, has served on the board of the Jewish Institute for Policy Research, been chair of the British branch of the New Israel Fund, and is a signatory of the Independent Jewish Voices declaration, which is critical of Israeli policies towards the Palestinians.

Dahrendorf's first two marriages ended in divorce. In 2004 he married Christiane Dahrendorf, a medical doctor from Cologne.

Education and career
Ralf Dahrendorf studied philosophy, classical philology, and sociology at Hamburg University between 1947 and 1952. He continued his academic research at the London School of Economics under Karl Popper as a Leverhulme Research Scholar in 1953–1954, gaining a PhD degree in sociology in 1956. At this early stage in Dahrendorf's academic career, he took an interest in Marxist theory and wrote his PhD thesis on Karl Marx's theory of justice. After completing his doctorate he returned to Germany, where he was a professor of sociology at Hamburg (1957–1960), Tübingen (1960–1964) and Konstanz (1966–1969) universities. He was one of the founders (1964) of the University of Konstanz.

From 1957 to 1959, Dahrendorf talked about "this ability to organize as the principle between quasi-groups and interest groups." Quasi-groups are defined as "those collectives that have latent identical role interests but do not experience a sense of "belongingness". Interest groups, on the other hand, "have a structure, a form of organization, a program or goal, and a personnel of members." The interest groups identity and sense of belonging are produced when people have the ability to communicate, recruit members, form leadership, and create a unifying ideology In 1960, he became a visiting professor of Sociology at Columbia University in New York.

From 1967 to 1970, he was Chairman of the German Sociological Association (Deutsche Gesellschaft für Soziologie), resigning it when he took up his office at Brussels. Between 1976 and 1979 he led the educational sub-committee of the Benson Commission.

From 1968 to 1969, Dahrendorf was a member of the Parliament of Baden-Württemberg, and also in 1968, his links with Harvard University began. Dahrendorf decided to become a member of the Bundestag in 1969 during the time when Brandt formed his first SPD-FDP coalition government. After joining, he was appointed parliamentary secretary to the foreign minister. Because he was placed third on the ladder of command in the foreign ministry, he did not enjoy the experience. From 1969 to 1970 he was a member of the German parliament for the Free Democratic Party (the German liberals). From 1969 to 1970 he was also a Parliamentary Secretary of State in the Ministry of Foreign Affairs. In 1970 he became a Commissioner in the European Commission in Brussels. He was dedicated to the EU as a guarantor of human rights and liberty.

In 1974, the BBC invited him to present the annual Reith Lectures. In this series of six radio talks, entitled The New Liberty, he examined the definition of freedom.

From 1974 to 1984, Dahrendorf was director of the London School of Economics, when he returned to Germany to become Professor of Social Science, Konstanz University (1984–86).

In 1986, Ralf Dahrendorf became a Governor of the London School of Economics. From 1987 to 1997, he was Warden of St Antony's College at the University of Oxford, succeeding the historian Sir Raymond Carr.

In 1982, Dahrendorf was made a Knight Commander of the Order of the British Empire. In 1988, he acquired British citizenship. and became known as Sir Ralf Dahrendorf (as only KBEs who are British subjects are entitled to use that title). On 15 July 1993, he was created a life peer with the title Baron Dahrendorf of Clare Market in the City of Westminster. Clare Market is near the London School of Economics, and is also used for car parking by LSE staff. Dahrendorf chose this name to honour the School in this way, and also as a sign of his liberal humour. He sat in the House of Lords as a cross-bencher.

Between 2000 and 2006, Dahrendorf served as Chairman of the Judging Panel of the FIRST Award for Responsible Capitalism. He received the FIRST Responsible Capitalism lifetime Achievement Award in 2009. Dahrendorf insisted that even the most basic civil rights, including equality and freedom of expression, be given constitutional legitimacy. On 11 July 2007, he was awarded the Prince of Asturias Award for Social Studies.

In January 2005, he was appointed a Research Professor at the Social Science Research Center in Berlin (WZB).

Dahrendorf held dual citizenship in the UK and Germany. After retiring, he lived partially in Germany and partially in the United Kingdom, with one home in London and one in Bonndorf in south-western Germany. When asked which city he considered his home, he once said, "I am a Londoner". He also once said that his life was marked by a conflict between the obligation he felt to the country of his birth, Germany and the attraction he felt for Britain.

He favored laws and policies that encouraged personal freedom, a sense of citizenship and a broadening of social, economic and political opportunities. Germany’s problems, he argued, stemmed from a belief in absolute answers and in the yearning for an all-powerful leader to put them into effect.

Death
Dahrendorf died in Cologne, Germany, aged 80, on 17 June 2009, after suffering from cancer.

He was survived by his third wife, three daughters, and one grandchild. His death was confirmed in a statement from Chancellor Angela Merkel, who said, “Europe has lost one of its most important thinkers and intellectuals.”

Concepts

Class and Class Conflict in Industrial Society
In 1959, Dahrendorf published in his most influential work on social inequality, Class and Class Conflict in Industrial Society. Despite later revisions and affirmations of his work, the book still remains as his first detailed and most influential account of the problem of social inequality in modern, or post-capitalist societies.

In analysing and evaluating the arguments of structural functionalism and Marxism, Dahrendorf believed that neither theory alone could account for all of society. Marxism did not account for evidence of obvious social integration and cohesion. Structural functionalism, on the other hand, did not focus enough on social conflict. He also asserted that Karl Marx defined class in a narrow and historically-specific context. During Marx's time, wealth was the determining factor in attaining power. The wealthy and therefore the powerful ruled, leaving no way for the poor to gain any power or increase their position in society.

Drawing on aspects of both Marxism and structural functionalists to form his own beliefs, Dahrendorf highlighted the changes that have occurred in modern society. Dahrendorf believed in two approaches to society, Utopian and Rationalist. Utopian is the balance of values and solidity and Rationalist is the dissension and disagreement.  While he believes that both are social perspectives, the Utopian approach is most apparent in modern-day society, leaving Dahrendorf to create a balance between the two views. Dahrendorf discusses literary utopias to show that the structural-functionalists idea of the social system is utopians in itself because it possess all the necessary characteristics. Specifically, with democracy came voting for political parties, and increased social mobility. He believes that the struggle for authority creates conflict. Money, political power, and social status were all controlled by the same group – the capitalist – which gave the workers little incentive to accept the status quo.

Furthermore, he believes that traditional Marxism ignores consensus and integration in modern social structures. Dahrendorf's theory defined class not in terms of wealth like Marx, but by levels of authority. Dahrendorf combines elements from both of these perspectives to develop his own theory about class conflict in post-capitalist society. Dahrendorf agrees with Marx that authority, in the 19th century, was based on income, and thus the rich bourgeoisie ruled the state. Yet things have changed then, where workers formed trade unions and allowed them to negotiate with the capitalist.

Class conflict theory
Dahrendorf developed, cultivated, and advanced his theory of class conflict. He proposes a symbolic model of class conflict with authority as the generic form of domination, combined with a strong systematic view of society and the structuration of class relationships. This new theory is said to have taken place in reaction to structural functionalism and in many ways represents its antithesis. The conflict theory attempts to bring together structural functionalism and Marxism.

According to Dahrendorf, functionalism is beneficial while trying to understand consensus while the conflict theory is used to understand conflict and coercion. In order to understand structural functionalism, we study three bodies of work: Davis and Moore, Parsons, and Merton. Dahrendorf states that capitalism has undergone major changes since Marx initially developed his theory on class conflict. The new system of capitalism, known as post-capitalism, is characterised by diverse class structure and a fluid system of power relations. Thus, it involves a much more complex system of inequality than Marx originally outlined. Dahrendorf contends that post-capitalist society has institutionalised class conflict into state and economic spheres. For example, class conflict has been habituated through unions, collective bargaining, the court system, and legislative debate. In effect, the severe class strife typical of Marx's time is not longer relevant.

Conflict theorists like Dahrendorf often took the exact opposite view of functionalists.  Whereas functionalists believe that society was oscillating very slightly, if not completely static, conflict theorists said that "every society at every point is subject to process of change". Conflict theorists believe that there is "dissension and conflict at every point in the social system" and "many societal elements as contributing to disintegration and change". They believe order comes from coercion from those at the top, and that power is an important factor in social order.

In developing his conflict theory, Dahrendorf recognised consensus theory was also necessary to fully reflect society. Consensus theory focuses on the value integration into society, while conflict theory focuses on conflicts of interest and the force that holds society together despite these stresses. In the past, structural functionalism was the commanding theory in sociology, until the conflict theory came along as its major challenger. However, both structural functionalism and the conflict theory have received major criticisms. In fact, Dahrendorf asserted that there has to be consensus to have conflict, as he said that the two were prerequisites for each other. The opposite is also true, he believed –– conflict can result in cohesion and consensus. However, Dahrendorf did not believe the two theories could be combined into one cohesive and comprehensive theory. Instead, Dahrendorf's thesis was "the differential distribution of authority invariably becomes the determining factor of systematic social conflicts". "In the end, conflict theory should be seen as a litte more than a transitional development in the history of sociological theory. Although the theory failed because it didn't go far in the direction of Marxian theory, it was still early in the 1950s and 1960s for American sociology to accept a full-fledged Marxian approach. However, conflict theory was helping in setting the stage for the beginning of the acceptance by the late 1960s".

The Liberal Order 
While Dahrendorf acknowledged that liberal market societies are prone to conflicts, he admonished that, at the same time, they were in the best position to handle the conflict. Instead of being suppressed, the tensions become factors that help societies move forward. It’s up to governments to turn the tension and conflict into solutions. The need is, then, for conflict management if this is to happen peacefully. Dahrendorf saw conflict in modern societies as stemming from more than just different individual interests and expectations. He saw conflict arising from outgrowing the unavoidable tensions that modern societies have to negotiate and balance between the competing values of justice, liberty, and economic well-being, and between economic efficiency, identity, and security. He sought to understand how societies could develop into just and prosperous nations. The essence of Dahrendorf’s ideas about the future of the liberal order is about identifying both latent and manifest tensions at the different levels in which they exist, the potential for conflict, and identifying the options available for solutions and resolving conflict.

Authority
Dahrendorf opposed those who studied authority on an individual level. He was very critical of those who focused on the psychological or behavioral characteristics of the individuals who occupy such positions. He went even further to say that those who adopted that approach were not sociologists. Dahrendorf believed that Marx's theory could be updated to reflect modern society and Roman society.  He rejects Marx's two-class system as too simplistic and overly focused on property ownership. Due to the rise of the joint stock company, ownership does not necessarily reflect control of economic production in modern society. Instead of describing the fundamental differences of class in terms of property, Dahrendorf claims that we must "replace the possession, or non-possession, of effective private property by the exercise of, or exclusion from, authority as the criterion of class formation". A crucial component to Dahrendorf's conflict theory is the idea of authority. Although it initially appears to be an individual issue and psychological, Dahrendorf argues that authority is related to positions and not to individuals. In this way, subordination and authority are products of expectation specified by society, and if those roles are not adhered to, sanctions are imposed. Dahrendorf expands on this idea with the notion that roles of authority may conflict when in different positions that call for different things. According to Dahrendorf, these different defined areas of society where people's roles may be different are called imperatively coordinated associations. The groups of society in different associations are drawn together by their common interests. Dahrendorf explains that latent interests are natural interests that arise unconsciously in conflict between superordinates and subordinates. He defines manifest interests as latent interests when they are realised. In conclusion, Dahrendorf believes that understanding authority to be the key to understanding social conflict.

Dahrendorf, like Merton, looked at latent and manifest interests and further classified them as unconscious and conscious interests. He found the connection between these two concepts to be problematic for the conflict theory. Dahrendorf believed that the basis of class conflict was the division of three groups of society: quasi groups, interest groups, and conflict groups. Thus, society can be split up into the "command class" and the "obey class". The command class exercises authority, and the obey class has no authority and is also subservient to that of others. With a clear interplay between both class types class conflict theory sought to explain that interplay. Quasi groups are "aggregates of incumbents of positions with identical role interests". Interest groups are derived from the quasi groups and they are organised with members, an organisation, and a program or goal. The main difference between quasi groups and interest groups are that interest groups organise and have a sense of "belonging" or identity. Darhendorf acknowledged that other conditions like politics, adequate personnel, and recruitment would play a role along with the groups. He also believed that under ideal circumstances, conflict could be explained without reference to other variables. Unlike Marx, however, he did not believe that random recruitment into the quasi group would start a conflict group. In contrast to Lewis Coser's ideas that functions of conflict maintained the status quo, Dahrendorf believed that that conflict also leads to change (in social structure) and development. His belief in a changing society separated Dahrendorf's ideas from Marx, who supported the concept of a utopia.

Marx and Dahrendorf's perspectives on class formation
Marx believed history to be defined as class struggle. He defined class as the difference between the dominating class and those who dominate. He believed that in modern society, there were three types of classes: capitalists, workers and petite bourgeoisie. The proletariat and the bourgeoisie are the pillars in the formation of classes. The Capitalists and bourgeoisie are the ones that own the means of production and are able to purchase the labor of others. The proletariat do not own any means of production or have the ability to purchase labor but can only sell their own. Marx believed that the battle between the different classes formed the concept of class phenomenon.

Marx understood that there are two classes: the rulers who control the means of production and the ruled who worked with the means of production. Every society needs both. The conflicts between them causes a destruction of the existing societal order so that it can be replaced by a new one.

On the other hand, Dahrendorf believed that the formation of classes was the organisation of common interests. That further means that people who are in positions of authority are supposed to control subordination, meaning that sanctions could be put into effect against people who fail to obey authority commands, resulting in fines and further punishments. Dahrendorf argues that society is composed of multiple units that are called imperatively coordinated associations. He saw social conflict as the difference between dominating and subject groups in imperatively-coordinated associations.

Marx believed that class formation was based on the ownership of private property. On the contrary, Dahrendorf argued that class formation was always based on authority. He defined authority as a facet of social organisations and as a common element of social structures. There is also another difference between Marx and Dahrendorf concerning the structure of societies. Dahrendorf believed that society had two aspects: consensus and conflict, static and change, order and dissension, cohesion and the role of power, integration and conflict, and lastly consensus and constraint. He saw them all as equally the double aspects of society. On that point, Dahrendorf asserted that society could not survive without both consensus and conflict. He felt that way because without conflict, there can be no consensus, and although consensus leads to conflict, conflict also leads to consensus.

Criticism
The most prevalent criticism to Dahrendorf's conflict theory is that it only takes a macrosociological perspective. The theory fails to address much of social life. In increasingly modern, multicultural societies, the contested concept and construct of identity received growing emphasis, and was the focus of many debates. As a consequence of the debates over identity, and inevitably in a globalising, modern, multicultural world, the issues of citizenship came into play. Specifically, the discussions analysed the ways in which citizenship contributed to the formation and construction of identities. Dahrendorf's adherence to a Marxian position seemingly prevented him from participating in these debates. Absent from Dahrendorf's theory were any significant discussions of culture, and therefore, citizenship and identity.

Relationship to other classical theorists and perspectives
Unlike many of the other works published by social theorists in the 1950s, Dahrendorf's work acknowledges the same class interests that worried Marx. Like Marx, Dahrendorf agreed that conflict is still a basic fact of social life. Dahrendorf believed that class conflict could have beneficial consequences for society, such as progressive change. Dahrendorf is recognised for being one of the best departures from the structural functionalist tradition of the 1950s. Dahrendorf criticised and wanted to challenge the "false, utopian representation of societal harmony, stability, and consensus by the structural functionalist school." Nevertheless, Dahrendorf still shares key ideas with structural functionalists, such as a general faith in the efficacy of political and economic institutions. Like Weber, Dahrendorf criticises Marx's view that the working class will ultimately become a homogeneous group of unskilled machine operators. Dahrendorf points out that in postcapitalist society there are elaborate distinctions regarding income, prestige, skill level, and life chances. Dahrendorf's pluralist view of class and power structures and belief that hierarchies of authority are inevitable in modern societies also reflect Weberian ideas.

The Ralf Dahrendorf Prize 
Since 2019, the German Federal Ministry of Education and Research (BMBF) has been awarding certain research projects with the Ralf Dahrendorf Prize. The prize  honors excellent research and supports the communication of scientific results to the public. Every two years, the BMBF awards prizes to researchers participating in the EU framework programme for research who have achieved exceptional success. The prize awards the winning research project with 50,000 euros, enabling winners to not only continue their research but explore different communication ideas. There is a jury made up of high class scientists and media personalities that help decide who should receive funding for their projects. The most recent winner of the Ralf Dahrendorf Prize was the Children Born Of War. Children Born Of War – Past, Present, Future, saw researchers from eleven research institutions in the European Union studied the life courses of children, fathered by foreign soldiers and born to local mothers, who were conceived during and after armed conflicts – a topic about which families, local communities and entire societies, often remain silent. Examples include children of the occupations during and after the Second World War in Germany and Austria, or children conceived through rape during the Bosnian War.

Further reading
 Marius Strubenhoff, 'Materialist Method, Agonistic Liberalism: Revisiting Ralf Dahrendorf's Political Thought', in History of Political Thought 39 (2018), 541–567
 Julie Smith, Ralf Dahrendorf (Lord Dahrendorf) in Brack et al. (eds.) Dictionary of Liberal Biography; Politico's 1998 pp. 89–90
 Julie Smith, Ralf Dahrendorf in Brack & Randall (eds.) Dictionary of Liberal Thought; Politico's 2007 pp83–85
Edward G. Grabb, "Theories of Social Inequality: Classical and Contemporary Perspectives." Ontario: Harcourt Brace & Company, 1997

Publications in printed in other languages

Works available in English
 Dahrendorf, Ralf. (1959) Class and Class Conflict in Industrial Society. Stanford: Stanford University Press
 Dahrendorf, Ralf. (1968) Essays in the Theory of Society. Stanford: Stanford University Press
 Dahrendorf, Ralf. (1967) Society and Democracy in Germany. New York & London: W. W. Norton & Company
 "The Modern Social Conflict". University of California Press: Berkeley and Los Angeles, 1988
 Dahrendorf, Ralf (1974) The New Liberty BBC Radio Reith Lectures
 Dahrendorf, Ralf. (1975) The Crisis of Democracy, Report on the Governability of Democracies to the Trilateral Commission.Excerpts of remarks by Ralf Dahrendorf on the governability study. NY: New York University Press. 
 Dahrendorf, Ralf (1990) Reflections on the Revolution in Europe: In a letter intended to have been sent to a gentleman in Warsaw. New York: Random House
 Dahrendorf, Ralf. (1979) Life chances: Approaches to Social and Political Theory. London: Weidenfeld and Nicolson,

Works available in French
 Dahrendorf, Ralf. (1972) Classes et conflits de classes dans la société industrielle. (Introduction by Raymond Aron), Paris: Gallimard

Works available in German
 Gesellschaft und Freiheit: Zur soziologischen Analyse der Gegenwart. Piper, München 1961
 Die angewandte Aufklärung: Gesellschaft u. Soziologie in Amerika. Piper, München 1962
 Homo Sociologicus: ein Versuch zur Geschichte, Bedeutung und Kritik der Kategorie der sozialen Rolle. Westdeutscher Verlag, Köln/Opladen 1965
 Gesellschaft und Demokratie in Deutschland. Piper, München 1965
 Konflikt und Freiheit: auf dem Weg zur Dienstklassengesellschaft. Piper, München 1972, 
 Pfade aus Utopia: Arbeiten zur Theorie und Methode der Soziologie. Piper, München 1974, 
 Lebenschancen: Anläufe zur sozialen und politischen Theorie. Suhrkamp-Taschenbuch, Frankfurt a.M. 1979, 
 Die neue Freiheit: Überleben und Gerechtigkeit in einer veränderten Welt. Suhrkamp, Frankfurt a.M. 1980, 
 Die Chancen der Krise: über die Zukunft des Liberalismus. DVA, Stuttgart 1983, 
 Fragmente eines neuen Liberalismus. DVA, Stuttgart 1987, 
 Der moderne soziale Konflikt: Essay zur Politik der Freiheit. DVA, Stuttgart 1992, 
 Die Zukunft des Wohlfahrtsstaats. Verl. Neue Kritik, Frankfurt a.M. 1996
 Liberale und andere: Portraits. DVA, Stuttgart 1994, 
 Liberal und unabhängig: Gerd Bucerius und seine Zeit. Beck, München 2000, 
 Über Grenzen: Lebenserinnerungen. Beck, München 2002, 
 Auf der Suche nach einer neuen Ordnung: Vorlesungen zur Politik der Freiheit im 21. Jahrhundert. Beck, München 2003, 
 Der Wiederbeginn der Geschichte: vom Fall der Mauer zum Krieg im Irak; Reden und Aufsätze. Beck, München 2004, 
 Werner Bruns, Döring Walter (Hrsg): Der selbstbewusste Bürger. Bouvier Verlag
 Engagierte Beobachter. Die Intellektuellen und die Versuchungen der Zeit, Wien: Passagen Verlag 2005
 Versuchungen der Unfreiheit. Die Intellektuellen in Zeiten der Prüfung . München 2006,

Awards and honours
 1975: elected member of the American Academy of Arts and Sciences
 1977: Honorary Degree (Doctor of Science) awarded by the University of Bath.
 1977: elected member of the American Philosophical Society
 1977: elected to the United States National Academy of Sciences
 1982: Knight Commander of the Order of the British Empire
 1989: Grand Cross with Star and Sash of the Order of Merit of the Federal Republic of Germany
 1993: Life Peer (Baron Dahrendorf)
 1997: Theodor-Heuss-Preis
 1999: Medal of Merit of Baden-Württemberg
 1999: Honorary Senator of the University of Hamburg
 2002: Knight Grand Cross of the Order of Merit of the Italian Republic
 2003: Pour le Mérite

See also
 Dahrendorf hypothesis
 List of liberal theorists

References

External links

 2011 Dahrendorf Symposium – Changing the Debate on Europe – Moving Beyond Conventional Wisdoms
 2011 Dahrendorf Symposium Blog
 Straddling Theory with Practice – Conversation with Sir Ralf Dahrendorf by Harry Kreisler of the Institute of International Studies; 4 April 1989
 Daily Telegraph obituary
 Biography at the Liberal Democrat History Group
 New York Times Obituary
 Lecture of Dahrendorf (25 May 1989) about 'The Decline of Socialism' at Gresham College (audio and pdf transcript)

 

1929 births
2009 deaths
British sociologists
Deaths from cancer in Germany
Crossbench life peers
Fellows of the British Academy
Fellows of St Antony's College, Oxford
Foreign associates of the National Academy of Sciences
Foreign Members of the Russian Academy of Sciences
German European Commissioners
German emigrants to England
German sociologists
German political scientists
Politicians from Hamburg
Members of the Bundestag for Baden-Württemberg
Members of the Bundestag 1969–1972
Knights Commander of the Order of the British Empire
Grand Crosses with Star and Sash of the Order of Merit of the Federal Republic of Germany
Recipients of the Order of Merit of Baden-Württemberg
Recipients of the Pour le Mérite (civil class)
Knights Grand Cross of the Order of Merit of the Italian Republic
Naturalised citizens of the United Kingdom
People associated with the London School of Economics
Politicians from Cologne
Sozialistischer Deutscher Studentenbund members
University of Hamburg alumni
Academic staff of the University of Hamburg
Academic staff of the University of Konstanz
Academic staff of the University of Tübingen
Wardens of St Antony's College, Oxford
German male writers
Members of the Landtag of Baden-Württemberg
European Commissioners 1970–1972
European Commissioners 1972–1973
European Commissioners 1973–1977
Members of the Bundestag for the Free Democratic Party (Germany)
Members of the American Philosophical Society
20th-century political scientists
Life peers created by Elizabeth II